Alexei Maximovich Parshchikov (25 May 1954 – 3 April 2009) was a Russian poet, critic, and translator.

Born in Olga, Primorsky Krai, Russian SFSR to the family of a famous physician, Maxim Reiderman (:ru:Рейдерман, Максим Исаакович), and a surgeon, L.S. Parschikova, Parshchikov was raised in the Ukrainian SSR and attended the Kyiv Academy of Agriculture. He spent two years as an agricultural scientist before entering Maxim Gorky Literature Institute (graduated in 1981).

In 1993, he received an MA from Stanford University. His dissertation was devoted to the works of Dmitri Prigov.

Parshchikov was regarded as the major figure of the Meta-metaphorist movement (a Russian poetic movement called by some critics "Meta-realism"), which Parshchikov founded along with Aleksandr Eremenko, Ivan Zhdanov and Ilya Kutik. In the last two decades, his works have been translated into fifteen languages. His publications in English include Blue Vitriol, translated by Michael Palmer, Michael Molnar, and John High and with an Introduction by Marjorie Perloff (Avec Books, 1994).

He resided in Cologne, Germany and died there.

References

External links
PennSound page
[https://web.archive.org/web/20140716103524/http://alumni.stanford.edu/get/page/magazine/article/?article_id=40250 Bard Without Borders: for a Russian poet, freedom poses challenges]
Oil, This poem by Alexei Parshchikov is translated here as a collaboration between Sergey Levchin, Richard Wayne Chambliss, Jr., and what is described as "Parshchikov's interlinear, editorial feedback from the poet Eugene Ostashevsky".
Alexei Parschikov 1954–2009 This "cyber-tombeau" at Silliman's Blog'' by poet Ron Silliman includes comments, tributes, and links

1954 births
2009 deaths
Russian avant-garde
Russian male poets
Soviet poets
20th-century Russian poets
Soviet male writers
20th-century Russian male writers
20th-century Ukrainian poets
Ukrainian male poets
Maxim Gorky Literature Institute alumni